"Down Bad" is a song by American record label Dreamville featuring performances by American rappers J. Cole, JID, Bas, Johnny Venus of EarthGang, and Young Nudy, released on June 12, 2019 alongside "Got Me" as the dual second single from the label's 2019 compilation album, Revenge of the Dreamers III.

Background
The song was created on the first day of Dreamville's sessions for the compilation album. Bas wrote on Instagram about his initial reaction to the song when he arrived in Atlanta: 

In February, Dreamville gave a live preview of the song after the All Star game – which J. Cole was the halftime show performer, during the free concert in Charlotte. In May, JID also gave fans a snippet of the single during his set at Miami's Rolling Loud Festival.

Under the EP 1-888-88-DREAM, the single was released with "Got Me" on June 12. The EP's title is referencing the "1-888-88-DREAM" phone number that Cole used to announce the original Revenge of the Dreamers in 2014. Dreamville representatives used hotline phone number to talk to fans and also play some exclusive tracks from the label's compilation album.

Composition
According to Genius, the song's "underlying beat is highly reminiscent" of "Rebel Without a Pause" by Public Enemy, although it is not a direct sample of the song.

Music video
The official music video of the song was filmed in Atlanta, Georgia, and was uploaded on YouTube on October 22, 2019.

Critical reception
Complex named "Down Bad" as one of the best songs of the week, calling it a "rowdy, kick-in-the-door anthem ready-made for summer mischief" and said the artists pack a ridiculous amount of energy into less than three minutes, beginning with a "tragically short verse" from Young Nudy and closing things with a "rapid-fire verse" from EarthGang's Johnny Venus.

Commercial performance
"Down Bad" originally peaked at number 75 on the US Billboard Hot 100. Following the release of its parent album, Revenge of the Dreamers III, the song reached a new peak of number 64. On November 22, 2019, the song was certified gold by the Recording Industry Association of America (RIAA).

Credits and personnel
Credits and personnel adapted from Tidal.

 Jermaine Cole – featured artist, composer, lyricist
 Destin Route – featured artist, composer, lyricist
 Abbas Hamad – featured artist, composer, lyricist
 Olu Fann – featured artist, composer, lyricist
 Quantavious T. Thomas – featured artist, composer, lyricist
 Pluss – producer, composer, lyricist
 Joe LaPorta – mastering engineer
 Juru "Mez" Davis – mixer
 Miguel Scott – recording engineer

Charts

Certifications

Awards and nominations

References

2019 singles
2019 songs
J. Cole songs
Bas (rapper) songs
Dreamville Records singles
EarthGang songs
Interscope Records singles
JID songs
Songs written by Asheton Hogan
Songs written by Bas (rapper)
Songs written by EarthGang
Songs written by J. Cole
Songs written by JID
Songs written by Young Nudy
Young Nudy songs